The Baum Building was a historic building in Oklahoma City, Oklahoma. In 1909, Moses J. Baum, a Mississippi-born merchant who specialsed in women's garments, leased the land at the northeast corner of Grand and Robinson and built a five-story commercial building on the site. The building was modeled after the Doge's Palace in Venice, Italy. The building was completed in 1910, with the Baum company moving in on May 5th, 1910. The building was designed by Layton and Smith and cost $140,000 to build.

During its lifespan, the building was also called the First Equity Building and the Insurance Center.

Demolition
The building was demolished between July and August 1972. The beautiful and ornate building became a victim of urban renewal and I.M. Pei's street straightening project. After demolition, Robinson Street was widened from 74 feet to 134 feet.

The building's marble columns were removed and preserved, and a mural within the building was moved to a Fidelity Bank building.

References

Buildings and structures in Oklahoma City
Demolished buildings and structures in Oklahoma
Office buildings completed in 1910
Buildings and structures demolished in 1972
1910 establishments in Oklahoma
1972 disestablishments in Oklahoma